Pictonemobius is a genus of insect in family Gryllidae.

Taxonomy
The Orthoptera Species File database lists the following species:
Pictonemobius ambitiosus (Scudder, 1878)
Pictonemobius arenicola Mays & Gross, 1990
Pictonemobius hubbelli Walker & Mays, 1990
Pictonemobius uliginosus Mays & Gross, 1990

References

Ground crickets